Concubinage is an interpersonal and sexual relationship between a man and a woman in which the couple does not want, or cannot enter into a full marriage. Concubinage and marriage are often regarded as similar but mutually exclusive.

Concubinage was a formal and institutionalized practice in China until the 20th century that upheld concubines' rights and obligations. A concubine could be freeborn or of slave origin, and her experience could vary tremendously according to her master's whim. During the Mongol conquests, both foreign royals and captured women were taken as concubines. Concubinage was also common in Meiji Japan as a status symbol, and in Indian society, where the intermingling of with different social groups and religions was frowned upon and a taboo, and concubinage could be practiced with women with whom marriage was considered undesirable.

Many Middle Eastern societies used concubinage for reproduction. The practice of a barren wife giving her husband a slave as a concubine is recorded in the Code of Hammurabi and the Bible, where Abraham takes Hagar as pilegesh. The children of such relationships would be regarded as legitimate. Such concubinage was also widely practiced in the premodern Muslim world, and many of the rulers of the Abbasid caliphate and the Ottoman Empire were born out of such relationships. Throughout Africa, from Egypt to South Africa, slave concubinage resulted in racially mixed populations. The practice declined as a result of the abolition of slavery.

In ancient Rome, the practice was formalized as concubinatus, the Latin term from which the English "concubine" is derived. Romans practiced it monogamously and the concubine's children did not receive an inheritance. The Christian Church tried to stamp out concubinage, but it remained widespread in Christian societies until the early modern period. In European colonies and American slave plantations, single and married men entered into long-term sexual relationships with local women. In the Dutch East Indies, concubinage created mixed-race Indo-European communities.

In the Judeo-Christian world, the term concubine has almost exclusively been applied to women, although a cohabiting male may also be called a concubine. In the 21st century, concubinage is used in some Western countries as a gender- neutral legal term to refer to cohabitation (including cohabitation between same-sex partners).

Etymology and usage

The English terms "concubine" and "concubinage" appeared in the 14th century, deriving from Latin terms in Roman society and law. The Latin terms are derived from the verb from  "to lie with, to lie together, to cohabit," an assimilation of "com", a prefix meaning "with, together" and "", meaning "to lie down". Concubine is a term used widely in historical and academic literature, and which varies considerably depending on the context. In the twenty-first century, it typically refers explicitly to extramarital affection, "either to a mistress or to a sex slave", without the same emphasis on the cohabiting aspect of the original meaning.

Concubinage emerged as an English term in the late 14th century to mean the "state of being a concubine; act or practice of cohabiting in intimacy without legal marriage", and was derived from Latin by means of Old French, where the term may in turn have been derived from the Latin , an institution in ancient Rome that meant "a permanent cohabitation between persons to whose marriage there were no legal obstacles". It has also been described more plainly as a long-term sexual relationship between a man and a woman who are not legally married. In pre-modern to modern law, concubinage has been used in certain jurisdictions to describe cohabitation, and in France, was formalized in 1999 as the French equivalent of a civil union. The US legal system also used to use the term in reference to cohabitation, but the term never evolved further and is now considered outdated.

Characteristics
Forms of concubinage have existed in all cultures, though the prevalence of the practice and the rights and expectations of the persons involved have varied considerably, as have the rights of the offspring born from such relationships, a concubine's legal and social status, their role within a household and society's perceptions of the institution. A relationship of concubinage could take place voluntarily, with the parties involved agreeing not to enter into marriage, or involuntarily (i.e. through slavery). In slave-owning societies, most concubines were slaves, also called "slave-concubines". This institutionalization of concubinage with female slaves dates back to Babylonian times, and has been practiced in patriarchal cultures throughout history. Whatever the status and rights of the persons involved, they were typically inferior to those of a legitimate spouse, often with the rights of inheritance being limited or excluded.

Concubinage and marriage are often regarded as similar but mutually exclusive. In the past, a couple may not have been able to marry because of differences in social class, ethnicity or religion, or a man might want to avoid the legal and financial complications of marriage. Practical impediments or social disincentives for a couple to marry could include differences in social rank status, an existing marriage and laws against bigamy, religious or professional prohibitions, or a lack of recognition by the appropriate authorities.

The concubine in a concubinage tended to have a lower social status than the married party or home owner, and this was often the reason why concubinage was preferred to marriage. A concubine could be an "alien" in a society that did not recognize marriages between foreigners and citizens. Alternatively, they might be a slave, or person from a poor family interested in a union with a man from the nobility.
In other cases, some social groups were forbidden to marry, such as Roman soldiers, and concubinage served as a viable alternative to marriage.

In polygynous situations, the number of concubines there were permitted within an individual concubinage arrangement has varied greatly. In Roman Law, where monogamy was expected, the relationship was identical (and alternative) to marriage except for the lack of marital affection from both or one of the parties, which conferred rights related to property, inheritance and social rank. By contrast, in parts of Asia and the Middle East, powerful men kept as many concubines as they could financially support. Some royal households had thousands of concubines. In such cases concubinage served as a status symbol and for the production of sons. In societies that accepted polygyny, there were advantages to having a concubine over a mistress, as children from a concubine were legitimate, while children from a mistress would be considered "bastards".

Categorization
Scholars have made attempts to categorize various patterns of concubinage practiced in the world.

The International Encyclopedia of Anthropology gives four distinct forms of concubinage:
Royal concubinage, where politics was connected to reproduction. Concubines became consorts to the ruler, fostered diplomatic relations, and perpetuated the royal bloodline. Imperial concubines could be selected from the general population or prisoners of war. Examples of this included imperial China, Ottoman empire and Sultanate of Kano.
Elite concubinage, which offered men the chance to increase social status, and satisfy desires. Most such men already had a wife. In East Asia this practice was justified by Confucianism. In the Muslim world, this concubinage resembled slavery.
Concubinage could be a form of common-law relationship that allowed a couple, who did not or wish to marry, to live together. This was prevalent in medieval Europe and colonial Asia. In Europe, some families discouraged younger sons from marriage to prevent division of family wealth among many heirs.
Concubinage could also function as a form of sexual enslavement of women in a patriarchal system. In such cases the children of the concubine could become permanently inferior to the children of the wife. Examples include Mughal India and Choson Korea.

Junius P. Rodriguez gives three cultural patterns of concubinage: Asian, Islamic and European.

Antiquity

Mesopotamia 

In Mesopotamia, it was customary for a sterile wife to give her husband a slave as a concubine to bear children. The status of such concubines was ambiguous; they normally could not be sold but they remained the slave of the wife. However, in the late Babylonian period, there are reports that concubines could be sold.

Assyria 
Old Assyrian Period (20th–18th centuries BC)
In general, marriage was monogamous. "If after two or three years of marriage the wife had not given birth to any children, the husband was allowed to buy a slave (who could also be chosen by the wife) in order to produce heirs. This woman, however, remained a slave and never gained the status of a second wife."
Middle Assyrian Period (14th–11th centuries BC)
In the Middle Assyrian Period, the main wife (assatu) wore a veil in the street, as could a concubine (esirtu) if she were accompanying the main wife, or if she were married. "If a man veils his concubine in public, by declaring 'she is my wife,' this woman shall be his wife." It was illegal for unmarried women, prostitutes and slave women to wear a veil in the street. "The children of a concubine were lower in rank than the descendants of a wife, but they could inherit if the marriage of the latter remained childless."

Ancient Egypt 

While most Ancient Egyptians were monogamous, a male pharaoh would have had other, lesser wives and concubines in addition to the Great Royal Wife. This arrangement would allow the pharaoh to enter into diplomatic marriages with the daughters of allies, as was the custom of ancient kings. Concubinage was a common occupation for women in ancient Egypt, especially for talented women. A request for forty concubines by Amenhotep III (c. 1386–1353 BC) to a man named Milkilu, Prince of Gezer states:"Behold, I have sent you Hanya, the commissioner of the archers, with merchandise in order to have beautiful concubines, i.e. weavers. Silver, gold, garments, all sort of precious stones, chairs of ebony, as well as all good things, worth 160 deben. In total: forty concubines—the price of every concubine is forty of silver. Therefore, send very beautiful concubines without blemish." — (Lewis, 146)Concubines would be kept in the pharaoh's harem. Amenhotep III kept his concubines in his palace at Malkata, which was one of the most opulent in the history of Egypt. The king was considered to be deserving of many women as long as he cared for his Great Royal Wife as well.

Ancient Greece 

In Ancient Greece the practice of keeping a concubine ( pallakís) was common among the upper classes, and they were for the most part women who were slaves or foreigners, but occasional free born based on family arrangements (typically from poor families). Children produced by slaves remained slaves and those by non-slave concubines varied over time; sometimes they had the possibility of citizenship. The law prescribed that a man could kill another man caught attempting a relationship with his concubine. By the mid fourth century concubines could inherit property, but, like wives, they were treated as sexual property. While references to the sexual exploitation of maidservants appear in literature, it was considered disgraceful for a man to keep such women under the same roof as his wife. Apollodorus of Acharnae said that hetaera were concubines when they had a permanent relationship with a single man, but nonetheless used the two terms interchangeably.

Ancient Rome 

A concubinatus (Latin for "concubinage" – see also concubina, "concubine", considered milder than paelex, and concubinus, "bridegroom") was an institution of quasi-marriage between Roman citizens who for various reasons did not want to enter into a full marriage. The institution was often found in unbalanced couples, where one of the members belonged to a higher social class or where one of the two was freed and the other one was freeborn. However it differed from a contubernium, where at least one of the partners was a slave.

The relationship between a free citizen and a slave or between slaves was known as contubernium. The term describes a wide range of situations, from simple sexual slavery to quasi-marriage. For instance, according to Suetonius, Caenis, a slave and secretary of Antonia Minor, was Vespasian's wife "in all but name", until her death in AD 74. It was also not uncommon for slaves to create family-like unions, allowed but not protected by the law. The law allowed a slave-owner to free the slave and enter into a concubinatus or a regular marriage.

Asia 
Concubinage was highly popular before the early 20th century all over East Asia. The main functions of concubinage for men was for pleasure and producing additional heirs, whereas for women the relationship could provide financial security. Children of concubines had lower rights in account to inheritance, which was regulated by the Dishu system.

In places like China and the Muslim world, the concubine of a king could achieve power, especially if her son also became a monarch.

China 

In China, successful men often had concubines until the practice was outlawed when the Chinese Communist Party came to power in 1949. The standard Chinese term translated as "concubine" was qiè , a term that has been used since ancient times. Concubinage resembled marriage in that concubines were recognized sexual partners of a man and were expected to bear children for him. Unofficial concubines were of lower status, and their children were considered illegitimate. The English term concubine is also used for what the Chinese refer to as pínfēi, or "consorts of emperors", an official position often carrying a very high rank.

In premodern China it was illegal and socially disreputable for a man to have more than one wife at a time, but it was acceptable to have concubines. From the earliest times wealthy men purchased concubines and added them to their household in addition to their wife. The purchase of concubine was similar to the purchase of a slave, yet concubines had a higher social status.

In the earliest records a man could have as many concubines as he could afford to purchase. From the Eastern Han period (AD 25–220) onward, the number of concubines a man could have was limited by law. The higher rank and the more noble identity a man possessed, the more concubines he was permitted to have. A concubine's treatment and situation was variable and was influenced by the social status of the male to whom she was attached, as well as the attitude of his wife. In the Book of Rites chapter on "The Pattern of the Family" it says, "If there were betrothal rites, she became a wife; and if she went without these, a concubine." Wives brought a dowry to a relationship, but concubines did not. A concubinage relationship could be entered into without the ceremonies used in marriages, and neither remarriage nor a return to her natal home in widowhood were allowed to a concubine. There are early records of concubines allegedly being buried alive with their masters to "keep them company in the afterlife".

The position of the concubine was generally inferior to that of the wife. Although a concubine could produce heirs, her children would be inferior in social status to a wife's children, although they were of higher status than illegitimate children. The child of a concubine had to show filial duty to two women, their biological mother and their legal mother—the wife of their father. After the death of a concubine, her sons would make an offering to her, but these offerings were not continued by the concubine's grandsons, who only made offerings to their grandfather's wife.

Until the Song dynasty (960–1276), it was considered a serious breach of social ethics to promote a concubine to a wife. During the Qing dynasty (1644–1911), the status of concubines improved. It became permissible to promote a concubine to wife, if the original wife had died and the concubine was the mother of the only surviving sons. Moreover, the prohibition against forcing a widow to remarry was extended to widowed concubines. During this period tablets for concubine-mothers seem to have been more commonly placed in family ancestral altars, and genealogies of some lineages listed concubine-mothers. Many of the concubines of the emperor of the Qing dynasty were freeborn women from prominent families. Concubines of men of lower social status could be either freeborn or slave.

Imperial concubines, kept by emperors in the Forbidden City, had different ranks and were traditionally guarded by eunuchs to ensure that they could not be impregnated by anyone but the emperor. In Ming China (1368–1644) there was an official system to select concubines for the emperor. The age of the candidates ranged mainly from 14 to 16. Virtues, behavior, character, appearance and body condition were the selection criteria.

Despite the limitations imposed on Chinese concubines, there are several examples in history and literature of concubines who achieved great power and influence. Lady Yehenara, otherwise known as Empress Dowager Cixi, was one of the most successful concubines in Chinese history. Cixi first entered the court as a concubine to Xianfeng Emperor and gave birth to his only surviving son, who later became Tongzhi Emperor. She eventually became the de facto ruler of Qing China for 47 years after her husband's death.

An examination of concubinage features in one of the Four Great Classical Novels, Dream of the Red Chamber (believed to be a semi-autobiographical account of author Cao Xueqin's family life). Three generations of the Jia family are supported by one notable concubine of the emperor, Jia Yuanchun, the full elder sister of the male protagonist Jia Baoyu. In contrast, their younger half-siblings by concubine Zhao, Jia Tanchun and Jia Huan, develop distorted personalities because they are the children of a concubine.

Emperors' concubines and harems are emphasized in 21st-century romantic novels written for female readers and set in ancient times. As a plot element, the children of concubines are depicted with a status much inferior to that in actual history. The zhai dou (，residential intrigue) and gong dou (，harem intrigue) genres show concubines and wives, as well as their children, scheming secretly to gain power. Empresses in the Palace, a gong dou type novel and TV drama, has had great success in 21st-century China.

Hong Kong officially abolished the Great Qing Legal Code in 1971, thereby making concubinage illegal. Casino magnate Stanley Ho of Macau took his "second wife" as his official concubine in 1957, while his "third and fourth wives" retain no official status.

Mongols 

Polygyny and concubinage were very common in Mongol society, especially for powerful Mongol men. Genghis Khan, Ögedei Khan, Jochi, Tolui, and Kublai Khan (among others) all had many wives and concubines.

Genghis Khan frequently acquired wives and concubines from empires and societies that he had conquered, these women were often princesses or queens that were taken captive or gifted to him. Genghis Khan's most famous concubine was Möge Khatun, who, according to the Persian historian Ata-Malik Juvayni, was "given to Chinggis Khan by a chief of the Bakrin tribe, and he loved her very much." After Genghis Khan died, Möge Khatun became a wife of Ögedei Khan. Ögedei also favored her as a wife, and she frequently accompanied him on his hunting expeditions.

Japan 

Before monogamy was legally imposed in the Meiji period, concubinage was common among the nobility. Its purpose was to ensure male heirs. For example, the son of an Imperial concubine often had a chance of becoming emperor. Yanagihara Naruko, a high-ranking concubine of Emperor Meiji, gave birth to Emperor Taishō, who was later legally adopted by Empress Haruko, Emperor Meiji's formal wife. Even among merchant families, concubinage was occasionally used to ensure heirs. Asako Hirooka, an entrepreneur who was the daughter of a concubine, worked hard to help her husband's family survive after the Meiji Restoration. She lost her fertility giving birth to her only daughter, Kameko; so her husband—with whom she got along well—took Asako's maid-servant as a concubine and fathered three daughters and a son with her. Kameko, as the child of the formal wife, married a noble man and matrilineally carried on the family name.

A samurai could take concubines but their backgrounds were checked by higher-ranked samurai. In many cases, taking a concubine was akin to a marriage. Kidnapping a concubine, although common in fiction, would have been shameful, if not criminal. If the concubine was a commoner, a messenger was sent with betrothal money or a note for exemption of tax to ask for her parents' acceptance. Even though the woman would not be a legal wife, a situation normally considered a demotion, many wealthy merchants believed that being the concubine of a samurai was superior to being the legal wife of a commoner. When a merchant's daughter married a samurai, her family's money erased the samurai's debts, and the samurai's social status improved the standing of the merchant family. If a samurai's commoner concubine gave birth to a son, the son could inherit his father's social status.

Concubines sometimes wielded significant influence. Nene, wife of Toyotomi Hideyoshi, was known to overrule her husband's decisions at times and Yodo-dono, his concubine, became the de facto master of Osaka castle and the Toyotomi clan after Hideyoshi's death.

Korea 
Joseon monarchs had a harem which contained concubines of different ranks. Empress Myeongseong managed to have sons, preventing sons of concubines from getting power.

Children of concubines often had lower value in account of marriage. A daughter of concubine could not marry a wife-born son of the same class. For example, Jang Nok-su was a concubine-born daughter of a mayor, who was initially married to a slave-servant, and later became a high-ranking concubine of Yeonsangun.

The Joseon dynasty established in 1392 debated whether the children of a free parent and a slave parent should be considered free or slave. The child of a scholar-official father and a slave-concubine mother was always free, although the child could not occupy government positions.

India 

In Hindu society, concubinage was practiced with women with whom marriage was undesirable, such as a woman from a lower-caste or a non-Hindu woman. Children born of concubinage followed the caste categorization of the mother.

In medieval Rajasthan, the ruling Rajput family often had certain women called paswan, khawaas, pardayat. These women were kept by ruler if their beauty had impressed him, but without formal marriage. Sometimes they were given rights to income collected from a particular village, as queens did. Their children were socially accepted but did not receive a share in the ruling family's property and married others of the same status as them.

Concubinage was practiced in elite Rajput households between 16th and 20th centuries.
Female slave-servants or slave-performers could be elevated to the rank of concubine (called khavas, pavas) if a ruler found them attractive. The entry into concubinage was marked by a ritual; however, this ritual differentiated from rituals marking marriage. Rajputs did not take concubines from the untouchable castes and refrained from taking Charans, Brahmins, and other Rajputs. There are instances of wife's  eloping with their Rajput lovers and becoming their concubines.

Europe

Vikings 
Polygyny was common among Vikings, and rich and powerful Viking men tended to have many wives and concubines. Viking men would often buy or capture women and make them into their wives or concubines. Concubinage for Vikings was connected to slavery; the Vikings took both free women and slaves as concubines. Researchers have suggested that Vikings may have originally started sailing and raiding due to a need to seek out women from foreign lands. Polygynous relationships in Viking society may have led to a shortage of eligible women for the average male; polygyny increases male–male competition in society because it creates a pool of unmarried men willing to engage in risky status-elevating and sex-seeking behaviors. Thus, the average Viking man could have been forced to perform riskier actions to gain wealth and power to be able to find suitable women. The concept was expressed in the 11th century by historian Dudo of Saint-Quentin in his semi imaginary History of The Normans. The Annals of Ulster depicts raptio and states that in 821 the Vikings plundered an Irish village and "carried off a great number of women into captivity".

Early Christianity and Feudalism 

The Christian morals developed by Patristic writers largely promoted marriage as the only form of union between men and women. Both Saint Augustine and Saint Jerome strongly condemned the institution of concubinage. In parallel though, the late imperial Roman law improved the rights of the classical Roman concubinatus, reaching the point, with the Corpus Iuris Civilis by Justinian, of extending inheritance laws to these unions.

The two views, Christian condemnation and secular continuity with the Roman legal system, continued to be in conflict throughout the entire Middle Age, until in the 14th and 15th centuries the Church outlawed concubinage in the territories under its control.

Middle East

In the Medieval Muslim Arab world, "concubine" (surriyya) referred to the female slave (jāriya), whether Muslim or non-Muslim, with whom her master engages in sexual intercourse in addition to household or other services. Such relationships were common in pre-Islamic Arabia and other pre-existing cultures of the wider region. Islam introduced legal restrictions and discipline to the concubinage and encouraged manumission. Islam furthermore endorsed educating, freeing or marrying female slaves if they embrace Islam abandoning polytheism or infidelity. In verse 23:6 in the Quran it is allowed to have sexual intercourse with concubines only after harmonizing rapport and relation with them. Children of concubines are generally declared as legitimate with or without wedlock, and the mother of a free child was considered free upon the death of the male partner. There is evidence that concubines had a higher rank than female slaves. Abu Hanifa and others argued for modesty-like practices for the concubine, recommending that the concubine be established in the home and their chastity be protected and not to misuse them for sale or sharing with friends or kins. While scholars exhorted masters to treat their slaves equally, a master was allowed to show favoritism towards a concubine. Some scholars recommended holding a wedding banquet (walima) to celebrate the concubinage relationship; however, this is not required in teachings of Islam and is rather the self-preferred opinions of certain non-liberal Islamic scholars. Even the Arabic term for concubine surriyya may have been derived from sarat meaning "eminence", indicating the concubine's higher status over other female slaves.

The Qur'an does not use the word "surriyya", but instead uses the expression "Ma malakat aymanukum" (that which your right hands own), which occurs 15 times in the book. Sayyid Abul Ala Maududi explains that "two categories of women have been excluded from the general command of guarding the private parts: (a) wives, (b) women who are legally in one's possession".

Some contend that concubinage was a pre-Islamic custom that was allowed to be practiced under Islam, with Jews and non-Muslim people to marry a concubine after teaching her, instructing her well and then giving her freedom. Others contend that concubines in Islam remained in use until the 19th century. In the traditions of the Abrahamic religions, Abraham had a concubine named Hagar, who was originally a slave of his wife Sarah. The story of Hagar would affect how concubinage was perceived in early Islamic history.

Sikainiga writes that one rationale for concubinage in Islam was that "it satisfied the sexual desire of the female slaves and thereby prevented the spread of immorality in the Muslim community." Most Islamic schools of thought restricted concubinage to a relationship where the female slave was required to be monogamous to her master, (though the master's monogamy to her is not required), but according to Sikainga, in reality this was not always practiced and female slaves were targeted by other men of the master's household. These opinions of Sikaingia are controversial and contested.

In ancient times, two sources for concubines were permitted under an Islamic regime. Primarily, women taken as prisoners of war become  concubines after harmonizing rapport which happened after the Battle of the Trench, or in numerous later Caliphates.
It was encouraged to manumit slave women who rejected their initial faith and embraced Islam, or to bring them into formal marriage.

The expansion of various Muslim dynasties resulted in acquisitions of concubines, through purchase, gifts from other rulers, and captives of war. To have a large number of concubines became a symbol of status. Almost all Abbasid caliphs were born to concubines. Several Twelver Shia imams were also born to concubines. Similarly, the sultans of the Ottoman empire were often the son of a concubine. As a result, concubines came to exercise a degree of influence over Ottoman politics. Many concubines developed social networks, and accumulated personal wealth, both of which allowed them to rise on social status. The practice declined with the abolition of slavery, starting in the 19th century.

Ottoman sultans appeared to have preferred concubinage to marriage, and for a time all royal children were born of concubines. The consorts of Ottoman sultans were often neither Turkish, nor Muslim by birth. Leslie Peirce argues that this was because a concubine would not have the political leverage that would be possessed by a princess or a daughter of the local elite. Ottoman sultans also appeared to have only one son with each concubine; that is once a concubine gave birth to a son, the sultan would no longer have intercourse with her. This limited the power of each son.

New World

When slavery became institutionalized in Colonial America, white men, whether or not they were married, sometimes took enslaved women as concubines; children of such unions remained slaves.

In the various European colonies in the Caribbean, white planters took black and mulatto concubines, owing to the shortage of white women. The children of such unions were sometimes freed from slavery and even inherited from their father, though this was not the case for the majority of children born of such unions. These relationships appeared to have been socially accepted in the colony of Jamaica and even attracted European emigrants to the island.

Brazil 
In colonial Brazil, men were expected to marry women who were equal to them in status and wealth. Alternatively, some men practiced concubinage, an extra-marital sexual relationship. This sort of relationship was condemned by the Catholic Church and the Council of Trent threatened those who engaged in it with excommunication. Concubines constituted both female slaves and former slaves. One reason for taking non-white women as concubines was that free white men outnumbered free white women, although marriage between races was not illegal.

United States 
Relationships with slaves in the United States and the Confederacy were sometimes euphemistically referred to as concubinary. From lifelong to single or serial sexual visitations, these relationships with enslaved people illustrate a radical power imbalance between a human owned as chattel and the legal owner of same; they are now defined, without regard for claims of sexual attraction or affection by either party, to be rape. This is because when personal ownership of slaves was enshrined in the law, an enslaved person had no legal power over their own legal personhood, the legal control to which was held by another entity; therefore, a slave could never give real and legal consent in any aspect of their life. The inability to give any kind of consent when enslaved is in part due to the ability of a slave master to legally coerce acts and declarations including those of affection, attraction, and consent through rewards and punishments, but legally the concept of chattel slavery in the United States and Confederate States defined and enforced in the law owning the legal personhood of a slave; meaning that the proxy for legal consent was found with the slave's master, who was the sole source of consent in the law to the bodily integrity and all efforts of that slave except as regulated or limited by law. With slavery being recognized as a crime against humanity in the United States law, as well as in international customary law, the legal basis of slavery is repudiated for all time and therefore repudiates any rights of owner-rapists had had to exercise any proxy sexual or other consent for their slaves.

Free men in the United States sometimes took female slaves in relationships which they referred to as concubinage, although marriage between the races was prohibited by law in the colonies and the later United States. Many colonies and states also had laws against miscegenation or any interracial relations. From 1662 the Colony of Virginia, followed by others, incorporated into law the principle that children took their mother's status, i.e., the principle of partus sequitur ventrem. This led to generations of multiracial slaves, some of whom were otherwise considered legally white (one-eighth or less African, equivalent to a great-grandparent) before the American Civil War.

In some cases, men had long-term relationships with enslaved women, giving them and their mixed-race children freedom and providing their children with apprenticeships, education and transfer of capital. A relationship between Thomas Jefferson and Sally Hemings is an example of this. Such arrangements were more prevalent in the American South during the antebellum period.

Plaçage 

In Louisiana and former French territories, a formalized system of concubinage called plaçage developed. European men took enslaved or free women of color as mistresses after making arrangements to give them a dowry, house or other transfer of property, and sometimes, if they were enslaved, offering freedom and education for their children. A third class of free people of color developed, especially in New Orleans. Many became educated, artisans and property owners. French-speaking and practicing Catholicism, these women combined French and African-American culture and created an elite between those of European descent and the slaves. Today, descendants of the free people of color are generally called Louisiana Creole people.

In Judaism 

In Judaism, a concubine is a marital companion of inferior status to a wife. Among the Israelites, men commonly acknowledged their concubines, and such women enjoyed the same rights in the house as legitimate wives.

Ancient Judaism 
The term concubine did not necessarily refer to women after the first wife. A man could have many wives and concubines. Legally, any children born to a concubine were considered to be the children of the wife she was under. Sarah had to get Ishmael (son of Hagar) out of her house because, legally, Ishmael would always be the first-born son even though Isaac was her natural child.
The concubine may not have commanded the exact amount of respect as the wife. In the Levitical rules on sexual relations, the Hebrew word that is commonly translated as "wife" is distinct from the Hebrew word that means "concubine". However, on at least one other occasion the term is used to refer to a woman who is not a wife specifically, the handmaiden of Jacob's wife. In the Levitical code, sexual intercourse between a man and a wife of a different man was forbidden and punishable by death for both persons involved. Since it was regarded as the highest blessing to have many children, wives often gave their maids to their husbands if they were barren, as in the cases of Sarah and Hagar, and Rachel and Bilhah. The children of the concubine often had equal rights with those of the wife; for example, King Abimelech was the son of Gideon and his concubine. Later biblical figures, such as Gideon and Solomon, had concubines in addition to many childbearing wives. For example, the Books of Kings say that Solomon had 700 wives and 300 concubines.

The account of the unnamed Levite in Judges 19–20 shows that the taking of concubines was not the exclusive preserve of kings or patriarchs in Israel during the time of the Judges, and that the rape of a concubine was completely unacceptable to the Israelite nation and led to a civil war. In the story, the Levite appears to be an ordinary member of the tribe, whose concubine was a woman from Bethlehem in Judah. This woman was unfaithful, and eventually abandoned him to return to her paternal household. However, after four months, the Levite, referred to as her husband, decided to travel to her father's house to persuade his concubine to return. She is amenable to returning with him, and the father-in-law is very welcoming. The father-in-law convinces the Levite to remain several additional days, until the party leaves behind schedule in the late evening. The group pass up a nearby non-Israelite town to arrive very late in the city of Gibeah, which is in the land of the Benjaminites. The group sit around the town square, waiting for a local to invite them in for the evening, as was the custom for travelers. A local old man invites them to stay in his home, offering them guest right by washing their feet and offering them food. A band of wicked townsmen attack the house and demand the host send out the Levite man so they can rape him. The host offers to send out his virgin daughter as well as the Levite's concubine for them to rape, to avoid breaking guest right towards the Levite. Eventually, to ensure his own safety and that of his host, the Levite gives the men his concubine, who is raped and abused through the night, until she is left collapsed against the front door at dawn. In the morning, the Levite finds her when he tries to leave. When she fails to respond to her husband's order to get up (possibly because she is dead, although the language is unclear) the Levite places her on his donkey and continues home. Once home, he dismembers her body and distributes the 12 parts throughout the nation of Israel. The Israelites gather to learn why they were sent such grisly gifts, and are told by the Levite of the sadistic rape of his concubine. The crime is considered outrageous by the Israelite tribesmen, who then wreak total retribution on the men of Gibeah, as well as the surrounding tribe of Benjamin when they support the Gibeans, killing them without mercy and burning all their towns. The inhabitants of (the town of) Jabesh Gilead are then slaughtered as a punishment for not joining the 11 tribes in their war against the Benjaminites, and their 400 unmarried daughters given in forced marriage to the 600 Benjamite survivors. Finally, the 200 Benjaminite survivors who still have no wives are granted a mass marriage by abduction by the other tribes.

Medieval and modern Judaism 
In Judaism, concubines are referred to by the Hebrew term pilegesh. The term is a loanword from Ancient Greek , meaning "a mistress staying in house".

According to the Babylonian Talmud, the difference between a concubine and a legitimate wife was that the latter received a ketubah and her marriage (nissu'in) was preceded by an erusin ("formal betrothal"), which was not the case for a concubine. One opinion in the Jerusalem Talmud argues that the concubine should also receive a marriage contract, but without a clause specifying a divorce settlement. According to Rashi, "wives with kiddushin and ketubbah, concubines with kiddushin but without ketubbah"; this reading is from the Jerusalem Talmud,

Certain Jewish thinkers, such as Maimonides, believed that concubines were strictly reserved for royal leadership and thus that a commoner may not have a concubine. Indeed, such thinkers argued that commoners may not engage in any type of sexual relations outside of a marriage. Maimonides was not the first Jewish thinker to criticise concubinage. For example, Leviticus Rabbah severely condemns the custom. Other Jewish thinkers, such as Nahmanides, Samuel ben Uri Shraga Phoebus, and Jacob Emden, strongly objected to the idea that concubines should be forbidden. Despite these prohibitions, concubinage remained widespread among Jewish households of the Ottoman empire and resembled the practice among the Muslim households.

In the Hebrew of the contemporary State of Israel, pilegesh is often used as the equivalent of the English word "mistress"—i.e., the female partner in extramarital relations—regardless of legal recognition. Attempts have been initiated to popularise pilegesh as a form of premarital, non-marital or extramarital relationship (which, according to the perspective of the enacting person(s), is permitted by Jewish law).

Concubinage and slavery 

In some context, the institution of concubinage diverged from a free quasi-marital cohabitation to the extent that it was forbidden to a free woman to be involved in a concubinage and the institution was reserved only to slaves. This type of concubinage was practiced in patriarchal cultures throughout history. Many societies automatically freed the concubine after she had a child. According to one study, this was the case in about one-third of slave-holding societies, the most prominent being case of the Muslim world. Among societies that did not legally require the manumission of concubines, it was usually done anyway. In slave-owning societies, most concubines were slaves, but not all. The feature about concubinage that made it attractive to certain men was that the concubine was dependent on the man - she could be sold or punished at the master's will. According to Orlando Peterson, slaves taken as concubines would have had a higher level of material comfort than the slaves used in agriculture or in mining.

See also 

 Courtesan
 Polygamy
 Polygamy in Christianity
 Polygyny
 Cicisbeo
 Contubernium
 Common-law marriage

References

Notes

Citations

Sources

Further reading 
 

 
Heterosexuality
Polygyny
Female beauty
Feminism